is a female TBS announcer, television presenter, and newscaster. She is nicknamed as Demi-chan(デミちゃん)  and Demicchan (でみっちゃん). Her hobbies are watching sports, gourmet tour, watching theater, playing golf, and running. She is ambassador of Aioi, Hyogo Prefecture.

Early life
Mai Demizu was born on February 11, 1984, in Tokyo, Japan. Her father was English interpreter. During her elementary school fourth grade, she moved with her family to Georgia, until she was second year high school. After returning to Japan, she entered International Christian University High School and graduates. She later entered Sophia University, on 2003 she won Miss Campus Navi Grand Prix. During her college days, she taking English language.

Career
In April 2006, Mai Demizu joins TBS as announcer, synchronizing with Mayumi Mizuno and Ryusuke Ito. On September 30 on same year, she making debut as announcer at a quiz show All-Star Thanksgiving, which she served as a break time promoter for the program. On August 25 until September 2, 2007, she served as a reporter at 2007 World Championships in Athletics which held in Osaka, she supported and interviewed. After that, she often appeared as a reporter in sports broadcasting. In March 2009, she became assistant on Discovery of the World's Mysteries, replacing Maya Kobayashi whom she left as TBS announcer. On July 13, 2015, she became ambassador of Aioi, Hyogo Prefecture.

Personal life
She is only child.

She is fluent in English, because her TOEIC was 980 point.

On Autumn 2021, she is currently taking post-graduate college with the aim of obtaining a Master of Business Administration (MBA).

Current appearances

Television

Radio

Former appearances

Television (TBS)

Regular appearances

Drama appearances

Television (Other than TBS)

Films

Bibliography

Magazines 
 CanCam
 January 2009 issue
 August 2010 issue
 Weekly Playboy (July 8, 2013 issue)

References

External links
TBSアナウンサー通信・出水麻衣
MAI MY BLOG (Mai Demizu's Official blog on TBS Blog)
365 days until 30→デミブロ Official blog on Ameblo

Japanese announcers
1984 births
Sophia University alumni
People from Tokyo
Living people